Kafila may refer to:
 Kaafila, a 2007 film
 Ilunga Kafila (born 1972), Congolese sprinter
 Kafila, Bangladesh